Izzet Avcı (born 1 January 1949) is a Turkish archer. He competed at the 1984 Summer Olympics and the 1988 Summer Olympics.

References

1949 births
Living people
Turkish male archers
Olympic archers of Turkey
Archers at the 1984 Summer Olympics
Archers at the 1988 Summer Olympics
Place of birth missing (living people)